èViva (in English: It is alive) was an Italian left-wing political party.

History 
èViva was founded by Francesco Laforgia (member of Article One) and Luca Pastorino (member of Possible) on 13 April 2019. The name of the movement has been chosen via an online-poll.

For the 2019 European Parliament election èViva joins the electoral alliance The Left, with Italian Left, Communist Refoundation and the Party of the South. The Left, that joined the GUE/NGL group, got only the 1.8%, without exceeding the 4%-barrier-threshold, so it didn't get any seat.

For the 2020 Regional election èViva joins many lists: in Tuscany "Tuscany to the Left" to support Tommaso Fattori, in Campania "Earth", in Apulia "Solidary and Green Apulia" to support Michele Emiliano, in Liguria "Shared Line" to support Ferruccio Sansa, in Emilia-Romagna "Brave Emilia-Romagna" (Elly Schlein's list) to support Stefano Bonaccini.

Following the victory of Elly Schlein at the 2023 Democratic Party leadership election, Laforgia joined the Democratic Party while Pastorino considered to do so.

Ideology 
èViva is interested in environmental problems and socio-economic disparities. Its ideologies are democratic socialism, pro-Europeanism and antifascism. It joins European Spring, the platform of DiEM25.

Electoral results

European Parliament election

Regional elections

References

2019 establishments in Italy
Democratic socialist parties in Europe
Ecosocialist parties
Italian Parliament
Left-wing politics in Italy
Political parties established in 2019
Pro-European political parties in Italy
Socialist parties in Italy